Emma Katherine Walton Hamilton (née Walton; 27 November 1962) is a British-American children's book author, theatrical director, and actress. She is an instructor in the MFA program at Stony Brook Southampton, where she serves as Director of the Southampton Children's Literature Fellows program and the Young Artists and Writers Project (YAWP). She is the daughter of singer and actress Dame Julie Andrews and set/costume designer Tony Walton.

Early life
Walton was born in The London Clinic in central London. Her parents are British actress and singer Julie Andrews and Tony Walton, a British set and costume designer. Her godmothers were actress Carol Burnett and Svetlana Beriosova, prima ballerina of The Royal Ballet; her godfather was British actor Vic Oliver. In 1967, her parents divorced, and two years later, her mother married film director Blake Edwards, who became her stepfather. Walton's childhood was spent between London, Los Angeles (where her mother worked), and New York City, where her father lived. She attended UCLA Lab School, according to her mother.

Career
From 1983 to 1991, she had a few bit parts in films and television, including Micki + Maude and That's Life!.

In 1991, she, her husband, and British-American actress Sybil Christopher founded the Bay Street Theater in Sag Harbor, New York. This independent non-profit theatre is still in operation as of 2022.  Walton-Hamilton was the theatre's Artistic co-Director and Director of Education and Programming for Young Audiences for 17 years.

She has voiced many audiobooks, including Gitty Daneshvari's School of Fear, Patrick McDonnell's Me . . . Jane, and Nancy Tafuri's All Kinds of Kisses. In 2010, she won the Grammy Award for Best Spoken Word Album for Children for voicing Julie Andrews' Collection of Poems, Songs and Lullabies.

In 2000, she began writing books for children in collaboration with her mother, starting with Dumpy the Dumptruck. They wrote 13 "Dumpy" books, of which 12 were illustrated by her father Tony Walton, who had remained friends with her mother despite their divorce. Walton-Hamilton and Andrews have co-written 31 children's books, including the "Dumpy" books, The Great American Mousical (2006), also illustrated by Walton, two "Bonnie Boadicea" novels for middle schoolers, The Very Fairy Princess (2010) series, and two unrelated novels. They have also co-edited two anthologies of poetry and songs, and one concept book, Thanks to You: Wisdom From Mother and Child. Walton-Hamilton has also written a book for adults, Raising Bookworms: Getting Kids Reading for Pleasure and Empowerment (2009). The book won a Parent's Choice Gold Medal, silver medals from the Living Now and IPPY Book Awards, and Honorable Mention from ForeWord Magazine's Best Book of the Year.

Walton-Hamilton and Andrews contributed to Kate Dawson, Jodi Glucksman, and Barbara Buck-Aronica's Over the Moon: The Broadway Lullaby Project (2012), a book with accompanying CD. In 2016, Walton Hamilton created the preschool television series Julie's Greenroom with her mother Julie Andrews and Judy Rothman. The show stars Andrews, joined by her assistant Gus (Giullian Yao Gioiello) and the Greenies, a cast of original puppets built by The Jim Henson Company. The show premiered on Netflix in 2017.

Personal life
In 1991, Emma Walton married actor/director Stephen Hamilton. The couple are parents to a son and daughter.

Filmography

Publications
 Dumpy the Dumptruck (2000)
 Dumpy at School (2000)
 Dumpy and His Pals (2001)
 Dumpy Saves Christmas (2001)
 Dumpy's Friends on the Farm (2001)
 Dumpy and the Big Storm (2002)
 Dumpy and the Firefighters (2003)
 Simeon's Gift (2003)
 Dragon: Hound of Honor (2004)
 Dumpy to the Rescue! (2004)
 Dumpy's Apple Shop (2004)
 Dumpy's Happy Holiday (2004)
 Dumpy's Extra-Busy Day (2006)
 Dumpy's Valentine (2006)
 The Great American Mousical (2006)
 Thanks To You: Wisdom From Mothers and Children (2007)
 Julie Andrews' Collection of Poems, Songs, and Lullabies (2009)
 Raising Bookworms: Getting Kids Reading for Pleasure and Empowerment (2009)
 Little Bo in Italy: The Continued Adventures of Bonnie Boadicea (2010)
 The Very Fairy Princess (2010)
 Julie Andrews' Treasury for All Seasons: Poems and Songs to Celebrate the Year (2012)
 Little Bo In London: The Ultimate Adventure of Bonnie Boadicea (2012)
 Over the Moon: The Broadway Lullaby Project (2012)
 The Very Fairy Princess: A Very Fairy Christmas (2012)
 The Very Fairy Princess: Here Comes the Flower Girl! (2012)
 The Very Fairy Princess: A Christmas Reader (2012)
 The Very Fairy Princess: A Fairy Merry Christmas (2012)
 The Very Fairy Princess: and the Sparkly Wedding Surprise (2012)
 The Very Fairy Princess: Follows Her Heart (2013)
 The Very Fairy Princess: Sparkles In the Snow (2013)
 The Very Fairy Princess: Teacher's Pet (2013)
 The Very Fairy Princess: Graduation Girl! (2014)
 The Very Fairy Princess: Makes the Grade (2014)
 The Very Fairy Princess: A Spooky, Sparkly Halloween (2015)

Awards
 Three Time #1 Bestseller
 Parents Choice Gold Medal 
 Living Now Silver Medal
 IPPY Book Awards Silver Medal
 Grammy Award, Best Spoken Word Album for Children

References

External links 

 Personal Website
 
 

1962 births
Living people
20th-century English actresses
20th-century English women writers
20th-century English writers
21st-century English actresses
21st-century English women writers
21st-century English writers
Actresses from London
Audiobook narrators
British expatriate academics in the United States
British expatriate actresses in the United States
British women children's writers
English children's writers
English film actresses
English television actresses
English theatre directors
English voice actresses
Grammy Award winners
Stony Brook University faculty
Writers from London